The Rt Rev Patrick White is a retired Bishop of Bermuda. He was ordained after a period of study at Wycliffe College and is now an honorary Doctor of Divinity there. Married to Elizabeth, he was elected in September 2008
 and consecrated in January 2009.

He retired from office in September 2012 upon his 70th birthday. He was succeeded by Nicholas Dill, who was consecrated as the Bishop of Bermuda on May 29, 2013. He now lives in the Toronto area.

Notes and references

Living people
University of Toronto alumni
21st-century Anglican bishops in Bermuda
Anglican bishops of Bermuda
Year of birth missing (living people)